Hondadelphys is an extinct genus of carnivorous sparassodonts, known from the Middle Miocene of Colombia. The type species, H. fieldsi, was described in 1976 from the fossil locality of La Venta, which hosts fossils from the Villavieja Formation.  Hondadelphys was originally interpreted as belonging to the opossum family Didelphidae, but subsequently assigned to its own family, Hondadelphidae and interpreted as a basal sparassodont. The genus name refers to the Honda Group, the stratigraphic group in which the fossils of this animal were first found, combined with delphys (Greek for "womb", a common suffix used for opossum-like metatherians).

References 

Sparassodonts
Miocene mammals of South America
Laventan
Neogene Colombia
Fossils of Colombia
 
Fossil taxa described in 1976
Prehistoric mammal genera